Stafford High School may refer to:

Stafford High School (Stafford, Connecticut), a school in Stafford, Connecticut
Stafford Senior High School, a school in Stafford County, Virginia
Stafford High School, a school in the Stafford Municipal School District near Houston, Texas